Eesti Raamat (Eesti Raamat OÜ) is Estonian publisher which is located in Tallinn. It publishes mainly fiction, including children's literature.

The publisher was established 1964.

Book series
"Ajast aega"
"Eesti novellivara"
"Eesti romaanivara"
"Klassikalised lood"
"Maailm ja mõnda"
"Mirabilia"
"Nobeli laureaat"
"Noorus ja maailm"
"Nüüdisromaan"
"Põhjamaade romaan"
"Saja rahva lood"
"Varamu"

References

External links

Book publishing companies of Estonia